This Is Your FBI is a radio crime drama broadcast in the United States on ABC from April 6, 1945, to January 30, 1953, for a total of 409 shows. FBI chief J. Edgar Hoover gave it his endorsement, calling it "the finest dramatic program on the air".

Producer-director Jerry Devine was given access to FBI files by Hoover, and the resulting dramatizations of FBI cases were narrated by Frank Lovejoy (1945), Dean Carleton (1946–1947) and William Woodson (1948–1953). Stacy Harris played the lead role of fictional Special Agent Jim Taylor. Others in the cast were William Conrad, Bea Benaderet and Jay C. Flippen.

This Is Your FBI was sponsored during its entire run by the Equitable Life Assurance Society of the United States (now AXA Equitable Life Insurance Company).

References

External links 
 This Is Your FBI episodes (1945–52)
 This Is Your FBI episode log

1940s American radio programs
1950s American radio programs
American radio dramas
ABC radio programs